Tbeti ( Tbeti) is a settlement in the Khetagurovo Community, Tskhinvali district of South Ossetia, Georgia.  It is located 2 kilometers west of Tskhinvali.

Geography 
Located on Shida Kartli plain.   900  meters above sea level.

See also
 Tskhinvali District

Notes

References  

Populated places in Tskhinvali District